A destructive outbreak of 14 tornadoes hit the Southeast. Seven of the 14 tornadoes were significant (F2+) and multiple populated areas were struck. Overall, the outbreak injured 11 and caused $460,030 (1961 USD) in damage.

Confirmed tornadoes

February 24 event

February 25 event

Hurtsboro–Hatchechubbee–Seale–Flournoys, Alabama

This strong F2 tornado first touched down in Hurtsboro and moved east-northeast. It hit Southern Wende, before moving directly through the town Hatchechubbee, which was heavily damaged. It then hit Northern Colbert before moving through Seale, which was also heavily damaged. The tornado then struck Southern Lato before striking Nuckols, again causing heavy damage. The tornado then crossed over Lake Bickerstaff and dissipated in Flournoys. Although it moved mostly through rural areas, the tornado left several homes obliterated while others were heavily damaged and many trees were blown down or broken off. Four people were injured and damage estimates totaled $25,000.

Non-tornadic impacts
The only report of hail from this event came out of Watson, Louisiana on February 24, where golf-ball sized hail was confirmed. Strong winds were much more common during the event. A  wind gust was also recorded in Edgewood in Roanoke, Virginia.

See also
 List of North American tornadoes and tornado outbreaks
 Tornado outbreak of February 23–24, 2016

Notes

References

Tornadoes of 1961
Tornadoes in the United States
F2 tornadoes
Tornadoes in Georgia (U.S. state)
Tornadoes in Alabama
Tornadoes in South Carolina
Tornadoes in Florida
Tornadoes in North Carolina
Tornadoes in West Virginia